Records of the Chinese clubs in the AFC Champions League.This details the participation and performances in the competition since its based at 2002 as a result of the merger between the Asian Club Championship, the Asian Cup Winners' Cup and the Asian Super Cup.

Overview

Legend
 Q : Qualified
 W : Withdrew
 P : Preliminary round 
 PO : Qualifying play-off round
 G : Group stage
 16 : Round of 16
 Q : Quarter-finals
 S : Semi-finals
 R : Runners-Up
 C : Champions

Statistics
Including Qualifying rounds: as of 10 April 2019

Statistics by clubs

Statistics by season

Finals

Statistics by club

Beijing Guoan

Changchun Yatai

Dalian Shide

Guangzhou Evergrande

Guangzhou R&F

Guizhou Renhe

Hangzhou Greentown

Henan Construction

Jiangsu Suning

Shandong Luneng Taishan

Shanghai Shenhua

Shanghai SIPG

Shenzhen Jianlibao

Tianjin Quanjian

Tianjin Teda

Statistics by opponent

A-League

Hong Kong Premier League

I-League

Liga Indonesia

J. League

K-League

Malaysia Super League

Philippines Football League

Qatar Stars League

Saudi Premier League

S. League

Thai Premier League

UAE League

Uzbek League

V-League

Top scorers

Bold Active in Chinese league teams

See also 
 Australian clubs in the AFC Champions League
 Indian football clubs in Asian competitions
 Indonesian football clubs in Asian competitions
 Iranian clubs in the AFC Champions League
 Iraqi clubs in the AFC Champions League
 Japanese clubs in the AFC Champions League
 Myanmar clubs in the AFC Champions League
 Qatari clubs in the AFC Champions League
 Saudi Arabian clubs in the AFC Champions League
 South Korean clubs in the AFC Champions League
 Thai clubs in the AFC Champions League
 Vietnamese clubs in the AFC Champions League

References

External links
 AFC Champions League official website
 AFC Champions League on RSSSF

Chinese football clubs in international competitions
Football clubs in the AFC Champions League
Football in China